Kllo (pronounced "Kl-oh"), formerly known as Klo, is an Australian music duo from Melbourne. It consists of vocalist Chloe Kaul and producer Simon Lam.

History
As a child, Chloe Kaul began writing songs with an acoustic guitar. At the age of about 14, she began recording her songs. Kaul's older cousin, Simon Lam, went to college for jazz drumming. He later became interested in electronic music. At the suggestion of Lam's mother, Kaul and Lam began making music together.

The duo's debut EP, Cusp, was released in 2014. The follow-up EP, Well Worn, was released in 2016. The duo released the first studio album, Backwater, in 2017. At Metacritic, the album received an average score of 76 out of 100, based on 8 reviews, indicating "generally favorable reviews". The duo released the second studio album, Maybe We Could, in 2020. At Metacritic, the album received an average score of 65 out of 100, based on 4 reviews, indicating "generally favorable reviews".

Members
 Chloe Kaul - vocals, keyboards
 Simon Lam - production

Discography

Studio albums
 Backwater (2017)
 Maybe We Could (2020)

EPs
 Cusp (2014)
 Well Worn (2016)

Singles
 "Potential" (2018)
 "Candid" (2018)
 "Back to You" (2019)
 "Only Existence" / "Final" (2020)

References

External links
 
 

Australian musical duos
Living people
Year of birth missing (living people)
Ghostly International artists